Cheuk Wan-chi (Chinese: 卓韻芝; born 28 March 1979), also known as Vincci, G and GC Goo-Bi, is a Hong Kong media personality, stand-up comedian, screenwriter and director, master of ceremonies, and an occasional television pundit and talk show host. She first came to prominence as a disk jockey and radio personality working for Hong Kong's Commercial Radio (CRHK).

Life
Cheuk Wan-Chi, popularly known as G, is a creative and media personality from Hong Kong, China. In 2008 Chi enrolled at Goldsmiths, University of London to study Fine Art, however she did not finish the degree due to low GPA. Working in a variety of mediums, her work is well received by Hong Kong's metropolitan middle class and youth.

Chi started her career at Commercial Radio Hong Kong (CRHK), when she was 13 years old, as the youngest ever radio DJ in Hong Kong history. In addition to being a long-serving prime time radio presenter, Chi also became a columnist for various newspapers and magazines; anthologies from these publications make her one of Hong Kong's best-selling authors, with a top-3 best-seller benchmark.

Chi has also released prose books and comic books.

In 2007, Chi directed two short films,  "Lost & Found" and "Homo Sapiens". In the same year, she released two prose books, named "Enemy of Kong Qiu" and "Dodgy".

On 19 April 2008, which was incidentally the day of Famine 30, Chi released a book of her selected prose, "What is Apple in Chinese?". She later held a book-reading-club function at Miramar Hotel on 25 April 2008.

Chi finished her contemporary art project Born to Be A Witness. Solo exhibition was held in Madhouse Contemporary in 2009.

In 2011 she held the first stand-up comedy solo show by a female comedian in Hong Kong. Her stand-up special “You Look Single” and “Come Rain Or Come Shine” were released through the streaming service Netflix.

In the field of celebrity endorsement, she often collaborates with internationally acclaimed brands; her public persona being one highly associated with creativity, social networking and fashion.

Early career and Radio
Whilst still a 14-year-old, Secondary 4 student at St. Francis' Canossian College, Chi worked as a part-time DJ at Commercial Radio; her first show being a collaboration with Softhard. After graduating from Secondary 5, she became a full-time DJ at Commercial Radio's FM 90.3. Aged 17 she presented 'Gee See Goo Bi – I am Underaged'; this programme was aired during off-peak hours and, for its time slot, attracted an unprecedented audience.

Chi also created the radio serial, "Gee See Goo Bi Family", of which the characters 'Fu-Wing' and 'Little Fu Sister' became break-out characters. It remains unknown as to who voiced "Fu-Wing" and "Little Fu Sister" in the "Gee See Goo Bi Family"; with claims that Chi voiced all five characters (in addition to"Fu-Wing" and "Little Fu Sister" the characters  "Miss Jing", "Neither-Male-Nor-Female", and the "Man with the Hoarse Voice")' Chi has never publicly clarified this.

Chi later created other programmes, including "Merry-Go-Round", "Five-Star Family", "Big Villager" and "36 Strategems".

'Fu-Wing' and 'Little Fu Sister' in other media
In February 2008, Chi collaborated with Taiwan-based FunTown and South Korean developer RHAON to launch the online game "RUNonline", known as "HiYo Run Towards the Sky" in Taiwan, it featured "Fu-Wing" and "Little Fu Sister".

The "Gee See Goo Bi Family" comic was created by Wu-Shang-Hao.。

Chi has written a column in the persona of and using the pen name Fu-Wing, titled "Fu-Wing's Writings", the column featured in Hong Kong lifestyle magazine Milk.

Chi is often credited as "GC Goo-Bi", a transliteration of "芝See菇Bi" (Gee See Goo Bi).

Resignation from CRHK
On 19 June 2008, Chi announced that she would leave CRHK two weeks later, that it would only be for a short break and that she would continue her art projects. She said that she probably would return to school, but that she was still undecided about her specific direction.

On 30 June 2008, during the Radio Television Hong Kong (RTHK) programme "Gimme 5", radio hosts Leung Tak-Fai and Wong Tin-Yee spoke emotionally of Cheuk's departure .

On 4 July 2008, Chi hosted the last episode of "Torture University". The following day before her official departure from the CRHK, she hosted the final episode of "Alabama".

On 3 July 2009, Chi announced, on the programme "Talk of the town", that she would be heading to London to study an art-related course.

On 5 July 2009, Chi flew to London where she took up an art course at Goldsmiths College, University of London; at the time it was believed that Chi would be emigrating to the United Kingdom. However, in September 2010, Chi returned to, and announced that she would be settling in, Hong Kong.

Charity
In February 2008, Chi was selected to be a World Vision Famine Star, and together with Sammi Cheng and Gigi Leung participated in a charity trip to Laos.

Film and video work
Chi's screenplays have garnered several award nominations from both Hong Kong and overseas organisations. As a director, Chi's work has included a diverse range of music videos, commercials, internet shorts and 35mm feature films. As a producer, she produced the 20-episode series "20/30 Dictionary"  which had fashion photographer Wing Shya as director.

As a screenwriter two of the films she contributed to, "20 30 40" and  "Cross Harbour Tunnel", were official selections in the Berlin International Film Festival. Her screenplay for Merry-Go-Round won her the Hong Kong Film Critics Society (HKFCS) Award for Best Screenplay in 2002, and was also nominated in the screenplay category in the Golden Horse Awards.

Chi has participated in many movie and video production projects. Together with the cyberWorks-owned Now.com.hk of PCCW, Chi has also written and produced an Internet drama series, "20 30 Dictionary".

In 2011, Chi participated in the acting and directing of the short film, "Love More"; a short video project "Love More" gained over one million hits with solely offline promotion.

In 2013, Chi released her debut feature film as director, the action comedy "Kick Ass Girls", which was financed by Lion Rock Pictures. Starring Chrissy Chau, Dada Lo and Hidy Yu, Chi was also part of the script writing team and has an acting role in the film as a goth personal assistant.

In 2014, Chi released her second feature film Temporary Family, which was financed by Edko Film. Starring  Nick Cheung, Sammi Cheng and Angelababy. It has grossed HK$16,535,069 in Hong Kong and ¥100,436,001 in China.

Awards and nominations

Movie awards
"Heroes in Love (2001)
Stockholm International Film Festival Bronze horse: Best film (Competition)
"Merry-Go-Round (2002)
 HKFCS Award Best Screenplay (Won),
Golden Horse Awards Best Adopted Screen Screenplay (Nominated)
Hong Kong Film Awards Best Screen Screenplay (Nominated)
"Exodus" (2007)
Golden Bauhinia Best Screenplay (Nominated)
"Wrong Dial (2011)
IFVA Open Category Silver Awards (Won).

Book awards
"What's apple in English?" HKPTU Best Ten Books 2009
"Your Heart is not a Public Toilet" HKPTU Best Ten Books 2011
"Granny's Quotes" HKPTU Best Ten Books 2013
 "The Necessity of Travel": Hong Kong Golden Book Awards 2016
 "The Necessity of Travel": The 29th Hong Kong Print Awards 2017

Bibliography

Stage Work

Stand-up comedy

 "One Night Stand", 13–17 July 2011. Venue: Hong Kong Academy for Performing Arts.
 "One Night Stand (Again)", 17–19 March 2012. Venue: Hong Kong Convention and Exhibition Centre.
 "I Dislike You" One Night Stand, 11–12 October 2012. Venue: Queen Elizabeth Stadium, Hong Kong.
 "I Dislike You" One Night Stand, Macau, 9 March 2013. Venue: Forum de Macau, Macau.
 "HAHASEX", 19–21 December 2013. Venue: Queen Elizabeth Stadium, Hong Kong.
 "Call For A Drink" One Night Stand, 32 shows between January to April 2015. Venue various.
 "You Look Single" One Night Stand, 5–6 December 2015. Venue:Queen Elizabeth Stadium, Hong Kong. 28–29 March 2016. Venue: PMQ, Hong Kong.
 "Come Rain Or Come Shine" One Night Stand, 26–28 August 2016. Venue: Macpherson Stadium, Hong Kong.
 "Love and Lie" One Night Stand, 27–28 October 2018. Venue: Macpherson Stadium, Hong Kong.
 "Love and Lie (Honeymoon Aftermath)" One Night Stand, 10 January 2019. Venue: Queen Elizabeth Stadium, Hong Kong.

Plays
 "Unidentified Human Remains and the True Nature of Love" 21-26 April 2015. Venue: Kwai Tsing Theatre Auditorium, Hong Kong.
 "No News is True News" 27 November - 8 December 2020. Venue: Kwai Tsing Theatre Auditorium, Hong Kong.
 "Sound Of Silence" 24 August - 4 September 2021. Venue: Hong Kong Arts Centre Shouson Theatre, Hong Kong. (Cast, Playwright and Director)
 "Rent A Human" 25 November - 4 December 2022. Venue: Kwai Tsing Theatre Auditorium, Hong Kong. (Cast and Playwright)

Filmography

Director 
Heroes in Love (feature film) (2001)
After (featurette: Nike women)
花灑 (MV: Leo Koo) (2006)
招摇 (MV: Grace Ip) (2006)
Lost & Found (featurette) (2007)
Homo Sapiens (featurette) (2007)
One Minute (featurette) (2011)
Wrong Dial (featurette) (2011) IFVA Open Category Silver Awards
Kick Ass Girls (feature film) (2013)
Temporary Family (2014)
Vital Sign（feature film）（2023）

Screenwriter 
Cross Harbour Tunnel (1999)
Official selected at Berlin International Film Festival,
Rotterdam International Film Festival,
Vancouver International Film festival,
Hong Kong International Film Festival.
Heroes in Love (2001)
Merry-Go-Round (2002)
Golden Horse Awards Best Adopted Screen Screenplay nominated,
HKFCS Award Best Screenplay,
Hong Kong Film Awards Best Screen Screenplay nominated.
20,30,40 (2004)
Berlin Golden Bear for Best Film Nomination.
Exodus (Hong Kong Golden Bauhinia Best Screenplay nomination, 2007)
Official selected at Toronto International Film Festival,
Official selection at Pusan International Film Festival,
San Sebastian International Film Festival Competition,
Golden Bauhinia Best Screenplay nominated.
Temporary Family (2014)
Vital Sign (Hong Kong International Film Festival closing film, 2023)

Actress 
Perfect Crime (愛你愛到殺死你) (1997)
Twelve Nights (十二夜) (2000)
La Brassiere (絕世好Bra) (2001)
Let's Sing Along (男歌女唱) (2001)
Feel 100% (百分百感覺) (2002)
If You Care (賤精先生) (2002)
Mighty Baby (絕世好B) (2002)
Heat Team (重案黐孖GUN) (2004)
Protégé de la Rose Noire (見習黑玫瑰) (2004)
Super Model (我要做Model) (2004)
A Chinese Tall Story (情癲大聖) (2005)
All's Well, Ends Well 2012 (八星抱喜) (2012)
Kick Ass Girls (爆3俏嬌娃) (2013)
The Midnight After (那夜凌晨，我坐上了旺角開往大埔的紅VAN)(2014)

Producer 
Web drama series 20/30 Dictionary for PCCW Now.com.hk (2004)
12-featurette campaign "Love More" funded by The Li Ka Shing Foundation. Directed and performed in "Wrong Dial" and "1 Minute" (2001)

Other Work

Radio programmes
 Open-minded Public Relation Practitioner (豁達公關) (1994)
 Softhard Morning Everyday (朝朝軟硬今朝) (1995)
 Girls do not worship (不崇拜的女孩) (1995–1996)
 Gee See Goo Bi–I Am Underaged (芝see菇bi我未成年) (1996–1997)
 Gee See Goo Bi–I Have A Head (芝see菇bi我有個頭) (1997–1998)
 Gee See Goo Bi Family (1998–2000)
 Gee See Goo Bi Family Day
 Herbal Tea (男上女下) (1999)
 Through life (過生活) (2000–2003)
 Torture University (五天精華遊) (2004–2008)
 Give me a call (給我電話) (2006)
 903 HKCEE Here with you (903 傍住你放榜) (2006)
 903 Top 20 (903專業推介) (2006)
 Alabama (2008)
 Talk of the town (一八七二遊花園) (3 July 2009)
 Talk of the town (一八七二遊花園) (3 Feb 2011)
 Talk of the town (一八七二遊花園) (6–17 Feb 2012)

Television

 The Green Hope (2000) Drama. TVB.
 Charlene's Reality Show (2007) TVB.
 I Know Men (2012) Chat show. TVB.
 Lipstick Circle (2012) Chat show. TVB.

Voice artist
 In the 2008 online game "Run Online", Chi plays the role of KiKi.

Advertisements
 Converse 100th Anniversary (2009)
 Dermes (moult company) (2008)
 Converse (2011)

Art 

On 31 May 2008, G announced on her blog that she was producing an art project called Born to Be a Witness. On 11 September 2008, she decided on the Chinese name for Born to Be a Witness, settling on characters translating to "Meet the big scene" for the Milk Magazine No. 373.

The Born to Be a Witness exhibition went from 10 to 24 January 2009 in Central, and was extended, continuing from 29th to 31@th.

 Milk Magazine Record

Newspaper columns 

 From 1999 to 2002, Cheuk was a columnist at the Oriental Daily, Sun Daily, Sing Tao Daily and Sing Pao. Her columns have been compiled into book form as "Live As A Whole Package", "Well Well" and others.
 6 December 2008 saw her last Apple Daily column, "Do not let me die at the weekend".
 3 March 2009 saw a new column in Ming Pao, titled "Cheuk Wan-chi is now writing". Later that year it was followed by two new columns "Romance and Prejudice" at New Monday Magazine, from 3 June, and "Cheuk Wan-chi Journey", for Ming Pao Weekly from 6 June.
 Cheuk's current column is "Big asking for too much" in Weekend Weekly.

Controversies

Attempted suicide 
On 18 October 2006, Chi attempted suicide using medication at her home in Kowloon City. The given reason for this was grief from the loss of her mother, who had died of cancer. Her boyfriend discovered her and contacted the police. After being certified as being out of danger of any life-threatening complications, Chi stayed in the intensive care unit. The police subsequently found two suicide notes, which revealed her unhappiness.

Two weeks later, Chi returned to work and continued to host her radio programmes, and also became again involved in film production work.

Denouncement for wearing fur 
On 27 February 2012, Chi uploaded a photo to her personal weibo, that showed her wearing a real fox fur,. This caused an angry response from internet users who denounced her through Facebook, Weibo and Discuss forums. Internet users at Weibo asked: "How can one talk about animal rights, if one can wear a corpse because of vanity?"; they did not accept Chi's apologies because of her frivolous attitude.

On 1 March 2012, Chi issued a video response to the incident on YouTube. She referred to the fur in the photo as one no longer wanted by a friend, and that since it was a real fur and she did not want to waste it, she accepted it for reuse. She emphasised her respect for animal rights, and apologised for any distress caused by the incident. However, some internet users were of the view that her statement of respect for animal rights was at odds with her wearing fur; and that because she did not apologise for the acts of cruelty to animals (needed to harvest fur), and because she did not openly urge the public to refuse fur, that they could not accept her explanation or apologies.

On 4 March 2012, internet users discovered that Chi, had for undeclared reasons, removed comments on the issue at Facebook, including comments both in support of and against her wearing fur. The internet users called this into question as, since she had set her Facebook as open to the public and to allow public comments, she should not delete comments indiscriminately.

References

External links

 as GC Goo-Bi

Blog

1979 births
Living people
Hong Kong stand-up comedians
Hong Kong women comedians
Hong Kong television presenters
Hong Kong women television presenters
Hong Kong radio presenters
Hong Kong women radio presenters
Hong Kong film actresses
Hong Kong film directors
Women film directors
Hong Kong film producers
Hong Kong screenwriters